This is a list of software to create any kind of information graphics:
 either includes the ability to create one or more infographics from a provided data set
 either it is provided specifically for information visualization

Vector graphics
Vector graphics software can be used for manual graphing or for editing the output of another program. Please see:
 :Category:Vector graphics editors
 Comparison of vector graphics editors
A few online editors using vector graphics for specific needs have been created. This kind of creative interfaces work well together with data visualization tools like the ones above.

See also
 Comparison of numerical-analysis software
 Diagramming software
 List of graphical methods

References

Comparisons of mathematical software
Graphics software
Infographics
Lists of software
 
 
Statistics-related lists